Carlos Ginzburg is a conceptual artist and theoretician born in 1946 in La Plata, Argentina. He studied philosophy and social theory.

Biography

Germano Celant, when writing about Arte Povera, invited Ginzburg by letter to join his movement.

As a conceptual artist interested in digital art, fractals chaos and fractal art, Ginzburg created what he calls "homo fractalus" – a concept about microcosm totality.

He has worked with the art critic Pierre Restany (with whom he developed the concept of "Political Ecology") and with Severo Sarduy who put him near Hokusai in "Barroco", one of the reference's books to Le Pli of Gilles Deleuze.

He has lived in Paris and since 2005 works with the French art critic and artist Allaïa Tschann.

Exhibition

Personal exhibition

 2011  Jerusalem Cross and Bis, 3e Rue, Paris, France
 2004  Susan Conde Gallery, New York
 2002  Galerie Lina Davidov, Paris, France
 1999  Galerie Lina Davidov, Paris, France
 1997  Galerie Mabel Semmler, Paris, France
 1980  I.C.C, Antwerpen, Belgium
 1978  Galerie Studio 16, Turin, Italy
 1977  Ecole sociologique interrogative, Paris, France

Collectival exhibition

 September 2010  Henrique Faria Fine Art, New York
 October 2009  Museo Nacional Reina Sofia, Madrid, Spain
 May–August 2009  Württembergischer Kunstvereim, Stuttgart, Germany
 2005  Slought Fondation, Philadelphie, USA
 2002  J. Wayne Stark Galleries, University Center Galleries, Texas A&M University
 2001  White Box Gallery, New York
 1999  Espace Electra, Paris, France
 1999  Abbeye de Roncereis, Angers, France
 1997  Espace Paul Ricard, Paris, France
 1996 Gallery of Art, University of Georgia, Athens, Georgia
 1995 Galerie Arx, Turin, Italy
 1994 Foundation, T.Z. Art & Co Gallery, Mai, New York
 1993 Institut National des Sciences Appliquées de Lyon
 1991 Foundation Battistoni, Paris, France
 1990 Ezra and Cecile Zilka Gallery, Middletown
 1989 Kaos Foundation, Chicago, Illinois
 1987 Ocre d'art, Châteauroux, France
 1983 Centre Georges Pompidou, Petit Forum, Paris, France
 1980 Fashion Moda, New York
 1975 Moderna Musee, Stockholm
 1973 I.., Antwerpen, Belgium
 1972 International Meeting of Arts, Pamplona, Spain
 1971 Musée d'art moderne, Buenos Aires
 1971 Camden Art Center, Londres
 ...

Official collection
 Reina Sofia Museum. 2010
 French national fonds of contemporary Art. 1988&1990
 Tate modern
 Centre Georges Pompidou

Conferences

 Université Paris VIII
 Université des Andes, Bogotá, Colombia
 École des Beaux-Arts d'Annecy
 École des Beaux-Arts de Mulhouse
 Faculté d'architecture de Venise, Italy
 Centre Georges Pompidou, Paris
 School of Visual Arts, New York
 École des Beaux-Arts de Caen

Bibliography

Pascale LE THOREL-DAVIOT

Nouveau dictionnaire des artistes contemporains, Larousse.

Gillo Dorfles

 1976 Ultima Tendenze dell'Arte d'Oggi, Milano, Italy
 1975 Del Significado a las Opciones, Madrid, Spain
 Dall Significado alle Scelte, Turin, Italy
 1972 Corriere de la Sera, Milano, Italy

Pierre Restany

 1996 Journal of Contemporary Art, Vol. 7-2, New York
 1990 Arte e Produzione, Italy
 1990 60/90, Ed. De la Difference, Paris, France
 1989, Revue Kanal, Paris, France
 ...
 1980, Voyages de Ginzburg, Paris, France

Severo Sarduy

 1992 Revue Art Press, Paris, France
 1991 Barroco Ed. du Seuil, Paris, France
 1989 Journal El Colombiano, Colombia
 1984 Revue Artinf, Buenos Aires, Argentine
 1983 Revue Art Press, Paris, France

Severo Sarduy et Klaus Ottman

 1990 Revue Art Press, Paris, France

Tim Jacobs

 1989, Journal New City, Chicago, Illinois

Jean-Claude Chirollet (philosophe, esthéticien, spécialiste de l'art fractaliste, Université de Strasbourg):

 1992, "Images fractales : biogénétique des images en restructuration continue", in Les Figures de la Forme, éd. L'Harmattan, Paris, p. 283-295
 1994, "En quel sens peut-on parler d'une Esthétique fractaliste?", in Littérature et Théorie du Chaos, éd. Presses Universitaires de Vincenne, Université Paris VIII, France, p. 115-140
 1998, Carlos Ginzburg – La complexité autoréférentielle du Sujet fractal, revue La Mazarine,
éd. du Treize Mars, Paris, septembre 1998, p. 112-114
 2002, "L’Approche de l'art d'un point de vue fractaliste", in Revue Tangence, numéro 69, été 2002,
Université du Québec, p. 103-132.
 2005, "Art fractaliste - La Complexité du Regard", éditions L'Harmattan, coll. Champs Visuels (www.librairieharmattan.com), Paris, France (Livre-synthèse sur les arts fractalistes depuis les années 1980. Nombreuses références à l'oeuvre et à la conception fractaliste de Carlos Ginzburg)

Paul Ardenne

 1997, Art, l'Age Contemporain, Ed. du Regard, France

Press

 1999
 
 Figaro magazine, 24 avril, France
 Journal le Monde, 16 mars, France
 Revue Beaux Arts Magazine, Identités, Mars, Paris, France
 Revue TechniArt, Mai, Paris, France
 Revue Cimaise, Mars, Paris, France

 1998

 Revue Paris Match, Janvier, France
 Revue Science et Avenir, Janvier, France

 1997

 Le Monde, 29 Nov, France
 Revue TechniArt, n°17, France

Articles and text of Carlos Ginzburg

 1999  Revue Art Press, n°244, Mars, Paris, France
 1997  Revue Art Press, n°229, Nov, Paris, France
 1995  Revue Archipielago, Madrid, Spain
 1993  Art Forum, Mars, New York
 Revue Ometeca, New Mexico, USA
Revue Histoire et anthropologie, Strasbourg, France
 1992  Revue Ligeia, n°10, Paris, France
 1987  Pour la Photographie, Univ. Paris VIII
 1986  Revue Leonardo, USA
 1969  Revue Pages, London, Great Britain
 1967  Revue Approches, Paris, France

Notes and references 
 

20th-century French painters
20th-century French male artists
French male painters
21st-century French painters
21st-century French male artists
1946 births
Living people
Postmodern artists
New media artists
French installation artists
French conceptual artists
Mass media theorists
Mathematical artists